The 1st Hollywood Critics Association TV Awards, presented by the Hollywood Critics Association, were originally supposed to be held at the Westin Bonaventure Hotel in Los Angeles on August 22, 2021; however, it was delayed a week and broadcast through a virtual ceremony without a host on August 29, 2021. Mckenna Grace and Brooklynn Prince announced the nominations via a livestream on July 8, 2021, on the organization's official YouTube channel. Ted Lasso led the nominations with 8, followed by The Handmaid's Tale and WandaVision with 7 each. Channelwise, HBO and NBC led the nominations with 29 each, followed by Netflix with 28.

The HCA TV Awards also became the first television awards organization to separate streaming programs from broadcast/cable shows, electing to give the streaming platforms their own separate category in drama and comedy, with the exception of the limited series/TV movie field, which isn't divided by platform.

Ted Lasso won the most awards of the night with four total, followed by The Crown with three.

Winners and nominees

Winners are listed first and highlighted in boldface:

Programs

Streaming

Broadcast Network / Cable

Acting

Streaming

Broadcast Network / Cable

Limited Series, Anthology Series, or Television Movie

Special Honorary Awards
 Legacy Award – Cobra Kai
 Virtuoso Award – Bo Burnham
 Impact Award – New Amsterdam
 TV Icon Award – Marta Kauffman
 Pop Culture Icon Award – Tom Ellis
 TV Breakout Star Award – Thuso Mbedu
 Spotlight Award – Zoey's Extraordinary Playlist

Most wins

Most nominations

See also
 5th Hollywood Critics Association Film Awards
 4th Hollywood Critics Association Midseason Film Awards

References

2021 television awards
2021 awards in the United States
TV Awards 01